CD-ROM Today was an American magazine targeted at computer users. Published from 1993 to 1996 by Imagine Publishing (now Future US), the magazine was initially issued once every other month, before becoming a monthly. Each issue included software and hardware reviews, as well as a CD containing fonts, video and text files, system updaters, freeware and shareware and demo versions of commercial software. Products were included for both Macintosh and Windows PC.

CD-ROM Today was the highest-selling review magazine for both Macintosh and PC users in 1996. In 1996, after four seasonal and 25 numbered issues, the magazine was discontinued, with two newer publications replacing it: MacAddict for Macintosh users, and boot for Windows users. Both magazines were first issued in August 1996 and have since been renamed MacLife and Maximum PC, respectively.

References

External links
Archived CD-Rom Today magazines on the Internet Archive

1993 establishments in the United States
1996 disestablishments in the United States
Monthly magazines published in the United States
Defunct computer magazines published in the United States
Magazines established in 1993
Magazines disestablished in 1996
Magazines published in California